Bulbophyllum dissitiflorum is a species of orchid in the genus Bulbophyllum An orchid Is a flower that is usually pink, and it can come in white as well.

References
The Bulbophyllum-Checklist
The Internet Orchid Species Photo Encyclopedia

dissitiflorum